Iredalea is a small genus of sea snails, marine gastropod mollusks in the family Drilliidae.

This genus was named in 1915 by Walter Oliver after Tom Iredale (1880–1972), an English-born naturalist who lived mainly in Australia.

Fossil species have been found in Pliocene strata of Italy and in Miocene strata of Indonesia; age range: 5.332 to 2.588 Ma.

Description
The narrow, solid and turreted shell has a fusiform shape. The protoconch consists of 4 whorls, with a sinusigera apex. The shell is axially sculptured by numerous slender and continuous riblets. The aperture  measures about a third of the length of the shell. The short siphonal canal is wide. The anal sinus is deep and broad, separated from the body whorl by a callosity. A brown band on the periphery is a usual feature.

Species
Species within the genus Iredalea include:
 Iredalea adenensis Morassi & Bonfitto, 2013
 Iredalea agatha (W.H. Dall, 1918)
 Iredalea balteata (A.A. Gould, 1860)
 Iredalea inclinata (Sowerby III, 1893)
 Iredalea macleayi (Brazier, 1876)
 Iredalea pupoidea (H. Adams, 1872) 
 Iredalea subtropicalis Oliver, 1915
 Iredalea thalycra (J.C. Melvill & R. Standen, 1896) 
 Iredalea theoteles (Melvill & Standen, 1896)
Species brought into synonymy
 Iredalea acuminata (J.W. Mighels, 1848): synonym of Pyrgocythara mighelsi (Kay, 1979) 
 Iredalea ella (Pilsbry & Lowe, 1932): synonym of Brephodrillia ella Pilsbry & Lowe, 1932
 Iredalea exilis (Pease, 1860): synonym of Paramontana exilis (Pease, 1860)
 Iredalea (Brephodrillia) perfecta (Pilsbry & Lowe, 1932): synonym of Brephodrillia perfectus  Pilsbry & Lowe, 1932
 Iredalea pygmaea (Dunker, 1860): synonym of Haedropleura pygmaea (Dunker, 1860)

References

 Vaught, K.C. (1989). A classification of the living Mollusca. American Malacologists: Melbourne, FL (USA). . XII, 195 pp.
 Bouchet P., Kantor Yu.I., Sysoev A. & Puillandre N. (2011) A new operational classification of the Conoidea. Journal of Molluscan Studies 77: 273-308

External links
 Oliver W.R.B. (1915) The Mollusca of the Kermadec Islands. Transactions and Proceedings of the New Zealand Institute, 47, 509–568, pls. 9–12
 Biodiversity Library: Iredalea

 
Gastropod genera